Gymnastics events were competed at the 1978 Southern Cross Games in La Paz, Bolivia.

Medal summary

Medal table

Artistic gymnastics

Men

Women

References 

South American Games
1978 South American Games
1978 Southern Cross Games